Dellai is a surname. Notable people with the surname include:

Ana María Dellai (born 1929), Argentinean alpine skier
Lorenzo Dellai (born 1959), Italian politician

See also
Della (name)